Veronica cinerea, called the ash-coloured speedwell, is a species of flowering plant in the genus Veronica, native to Turkey and Lebanon/Syria. An evergreen, matforming perennial useful as a ground cover, it has gained the Royal Horticultural Society's Award of Garden Merit.

References

cinerea
Flora of Turkey
Flora of Lebanon and Syria
Plants described in 1859